Edward John Stanley, 2nd Baron Stanley of Alderley,  (13 November 180216 June 1869), known as The Lord Eddisbury between 1848 and 1850, was a British politician.

Background
Stanley was the son of John Stanley, 1st Baron Stanley of Alderley, and Lady Maria Josepha, daughter of John Holroyd, 1st Earl of Sheffield. He was educated at Eton College and Christ Church, Oxford.

Political career
Stanley entered the House of Commons as Whig Member of Parliament (MP) for Hindon in 1831 and was later member for North Cheshire between 1832 and 1841, and between 1847 and 1848. He served under Lord Melbourne as Patronage Secretary to the Treasury from 1835 to 1841, as Under-Secretary of State for the Home Department in 1841 and as Paymaster-General in 1841 and under Lord John Russell as Under-Secretary of State for Foreign Affairs between 1846 and 1852. He was sworn of the Privy Council in 1841 and in 1848, two years before he succeeded to the barony of Stanley, he was created Baron Eddisbury, of Winnington in the County Palatine of Chester.

Stanley was President of the Board of Trade under Lord Palmerston from 1855 to 1858, and Postmaster-General under Palmerston and then Lord John Russell from 1860 to 1866. In 1861 he established the Post Office Savings Bank.

Family
Lord Stanley of Alderley married Henrietta Maria (21 December 180716 February 1895), a daughter of Viscount Dillon, in 1826. Lord and Lady Stanley of Alderley had ten children:

 Henry Edward John, 3rd Baron Stanley of Alderley (1827–1903)
 Alice Margaret (1828–1910), wife of Augustus Pitt Rivers
 (Henrietta) Blanche (1830–1921), later Countess of Airlie, wife of David Ogilvy; a grandmother of Clementine Churchill, and a great-grandmother of the Mitford sisters
 Maude Alethea (1832–1915)
 Cecilia (died 1839)
 John Constantine (1837–78)
 Edward Lyulph Stanley, 4th Baron Stanley of Alderley (1839–1925)
 Algernon Charles (1843–1928), Roman Catholic Bishop of Emmaus (in partibus)
 Katherine Louisa (1844–74), later Viscountess Amberley, wife of John Russell, Viscount Amberley; mother of the philosopher Bertrand Russell
 Rosalind Frances (1845–1921), later Countess of Carlisle, became the chatelaine of Castle Howard and a radical temperance campaigner.

Lord Stanley of Alderley died in June 1869, aged 66, and was succeeded by his eldest son, Henry. Lady Stanley of Alderley died in February 1895, aged 87.

In the 1930s his family's letters were published by his descendant Nancy Mitford as:
 The Ladies of Alderley: Letters 1841–1850 (Hamish Hamilton, 1938)
 The Stanleys of Alderley: Their letters 1851–1865 (Chapman & Hall, 1939)

References

External links 
 

Whig (British political party) MPs
Stanley, Edward John
United Kingdom Paymasters General
Members of the Privy Council of the United Kingdom
Barons Stanley of Alderley
Eldest sons of British hereditary barons
Alderley, Edward Stanley, 2nd Baron Stanley of
People educated at Eton College
Alumni of Christ Church, Oxford
Stanley, Edward John
Stanley, Edward John
Stanley, Edward John
Stanley, Edward John
Stanley, Edward John
UK MPs who inherited peerages
UK MPs who were granted peerages
1802 births
1869 deaths
Edward
Liberal Party (UK) MPs for English constituencies
British twins
Presidents of the Board of Trade
Peers of the United Kingdom created by Queen Victoria